Cyrtophora, the tent-web spiders, is a genus of orb-weaver spiders first described by Eugène Simon in 1895. Although they are in the "orb weaver" family, they do not build orb webs. Their tent-like, highly complex non-sticky web is sometimes considered a precursor of the simplified orb web. These webs are aligned horizontally, with a network of supporting threads above them. These spiders often live in colonies. Some members, including Cyrtophora cicatrosa, exhibit the ability to change colour rapidly.

A kleptoparasitic spider (Argyrodes fissifrons) was found to live in a mutualistic relationships with Cyrtophora species. Some of the species are considered social spiders, building large structures where the territories of the offspring are built along the margin of the mothers web.

Species
 it contains fifty-three species:
C. admiralia Strand, 1913 – Admiralty Is.
C. beccarii (Thorell, 1878) – Laos, Malaysia to Australia (Northern Territory)
C. bicauda (Saito, 1933) – Taiwan
C. bidenta Tikader, 1970 – India
C. bimaculata Han, Zhang & Zhu, 2010 – China
C. bituberculata Roy, Saha & Raychaudhuri, 2017 – India
C. caudata Bösenberg & Lenz, 1895 – East Africa
C. cephalotes Simon, 1877 – Philippines
C. cicatrosa (Stoliczka, 1869) – Pakistan to Australia (Northern Territory)
C. citricola (Forsskål, 1775) – Southern Europe, Africa, Middle East, Pakistan, India, China, Japan. Introduced to Dominican Rep., Costa Rica, Colombia, Brazil
Cyrtophora c. abessinensis Strand, 1906 – Ethiopia
Cyrtophora c. lurida Karsch, 1879 – West Africa
Cyrtophora c. minahassae Merian, 1911 – Indonesia (Sulawesi)
C. cordiformis (L. Koch, 1871) – New Guinea, Australia (Queensland, Lord Howe Is.)
C. crassipes (Rainbow, 1897) – Australia (New South Wales)
C. cylindroides (Walckenaer, 1841) – China to Australia (Queensland)
Cyrtophora c. scalaris Strand, 1915 – Papua New Guinea (New Britain)
C. diazoma (Thorell, 1890) – Indonesia (Sumatra)
C. doriae (Thorell, 1881) – New Guinea, Papua New Guinea (Bismarck Arch.)
C. eczematica (Thorell, 1892) – Malaysia, Indonesia (Java, Sulawesi), New Guinea
C. exanthematica (Doleschall, 1859) – Myanmar to Philippines, Australia (New South Wales)
C. feae (Thorell, 1887) – India to Myanmar
C. forbesi (Thorell, 1890) – Indonesia (Sumatra)
C. gazellae (Karsch, 1878) – Papua New Guinea (New Britain)
C. gemmosa Thorell, 1899 – Cameroon
C. guangxiensis Yin, Wang, Xie & Peng, 1990 – China
C. hainanensis Yin, Wang, Xie & Peng, 1990 – China
C. hirta L. Koch, 1872 – Australia (Queensland, New South Wales)
C. ikomosanensis (Bösenberg & Strand, 1906) – Taiwan, Japan
C. jabalpurensis Gajbe & Gajbe, 1999 – India
C. koronadalensis Barrion & Litsinger, 1995 – Philippines
C. ksudra Sherriffs, 1928 – India
C. lacunaris Yin, Wang, Xie & Peng, 1990 – China
C. lahirii Biswas & Raychaudhuri, 2004 – Bangladesh
C. larinioides Simon, 1895 – Cameroon
C. limbata (Thorell, 1898) – Myanmar
C. lineata Kulczyński, 1910 – Solomon Is., Bismarck Arch.
C. moluccensis (Doleschall, 1857) – India to Japan, Indonesia, Papua New Guinea, Australia, Fiji, Tonga, French Polynesia
Cyrtophora m. albidinota Strand, 1911 – Caroline Is., Palau Is., Yap Is.
Cyrtophora m. bukae Strand, 1911 – Solomon Is.
Cyrtophora m. cupidinea (Thorell, 1875) – New Caledonia
Cyrtophora m. margaritacea (Doleschall, 1859) – Indonesia (Java)
Cyrtophora m. rubicundinota Strand, 1911 – Papua New Guinea (Keile Is.)
C. monulfi Chrysanthus, 1960 – New Guinea, Australia (Northern Territory)
C. nareshi Biswas & Raychaudhuri, 2004 – Bangladesh
C. parangexanthematica Barrion & Litsinger, 1995 – Philippines
C. parnasia L. Koch, 1872 – Australia, Tasmania
C. petersi Karsch, 1878 – Mozambique
C. rainbowi (Roewer, 1955) – Australia (New South Wales)
C. sextuberculata Tanikawa & Petcharad, 2015 – Thailand
C. subacalypha (Simon, 1882) – Yemen
C. trigona (L. Koch, 1871) – Australia (Queensland), New Guinea
C. unicolor (Doleschall, 1857) – India, Sri Lanka to Japan, Philippines, New Guinea, Australia (Christmas Is.)

References

External links

 Pictures of several Cyrtophora species
  Russian Tent Spider C. hirta (illustrations of web construction)
 Pictures of C. citricola
 Beccari's Tent Spider (C. beccarii)
 Photos and information about Cyrtophora exanthematica
 Photos and information about Cyrtophora citricola

 
Araneomorphae genera
Spiders of Asia
Spiders of Africa
Spiders of Australia